Duvernay is a district in the eastern part of Laval and was a separate city until the municipal mergers on August 6, 1965.

Geography
It is located south-west of Saint-Francois, south-east of Auteuil, east of Vimont and Pont-Viau and around Sant-Vincent-de-Paul. The Rivière des Prairies passes to the south.

Demographics

Education
Commission scolaire de Laval operates French-language public schools.
 École secondaire Leblanc
 École primaire Des Ormeaux
 École primaire J.-Jean-Joubert
 École primaire Notre-Dame-du-Sourire
 École primaire Val-des-Arbres 
 , it has about 430 students

Sir Wilfrid Laurier School Board (SWLSB) operates English-language public schools. Elementary schools serving sections of Duvernay:
 Genesis Elementary School
 Jules Verne Elementary School
 St. Paul Elementary School
  it has about 430 students.
All sections of Laval are zoned to Laval Junior Academy and Laval Senior Academy

SWLSB previously had its headquarters in Duvernay.

References

External links
City of Laval, official website

Neighbourhoods in Laval, Quebec
Former municipalities in Quebec
Populated places disestablished in 1965